CGU Insurance Limited is an Australian intermediary-based insurance company and forms part of Insurance Australia Group (IAG).

CGU Insurance was formed through the global merger of Commercial Union plc and NZI's parent company, General Accident plc. The global merger brought together two highly regarded insurers with almost 160 years of experience in Australia. The acronyms of those two insurers were melded together to form CGU which is subsequently no longer an acronym.

CGU Insurance sells its insurance products through a network of over 1,000 intermediaries, and more than 100 business partners. CGU employs over 4,000 employees located in over 75 branches and representative offices spread throughout Australia.

References

External links

Financial services companies established in 1998
Insurance companies of Australia